Ruth Hertz Weber aka Ruth Lopez-Yañez is a San Diego based composer, conductor, and pianist. She is a member of The Recording Academy.

Biography

As a composer, Ruth's songs have been recorded in the U.S. and abroad, and she has been a winner of the New York Pro/Am Songwriting Competition, The Canadian Songwriting Competition, the Jewish American Songwriting Competition and the Music City Song Festival, among others. Her songs have appeared in film and print music.

An advocate for education, Ruth and her daughter Emilia Lopez-Yañez make up the children's music group Ruth and Emilia. Their debut album "The Spaceship that Fell in My Backyard" received rave reviews and won numerous awards  including the [Hollywood Music in Media Awards].

Ruth is presently the Artistic Director/Conductor of The San Diego Jewish Men's Choir, which performs over 25 concerts per year in the Southern California area. The choir released its first award-winning album, “Heritage,” on Jan.1, 2014, and its second multi award-winning and Billboard (magazine) charting album, KOCHI, in 2015. Under Ruth's leadership the group received a proclamation from Mayor Todd Gloria proclaiming the men's choir's festival/ release party as Chanukah JAM Day 2013. Ruth Weber and the Men's Choir have performed on national television as guests on the Chabad Telethon 2014 and on two Jewish Life Television episodes. In 2018, Ruth organized a tour for the choir to travel to Omaha, NE, where they performed alongside the Omaha Symphony under the direction of conductor Enrico Lopez-Yañez, and later to Phoenix, AZ.

Ruth Weber was named music director for the Center for Jewish Cultural Renaissance after her success with these festivals. Ruth was the founder of the Cuyamaca College Chorus and the Accompanying Ensemble at Palomar College. She organized the “A Night at the Opera” fundraiser concerts, which raised over $30,000 the first year, benefiting the student support services at Poway High School, and saving the valuable program for two years in a row.

As one of the music directors at the First United Methodist Church in Escondido, Ruth directed the Children's Choir, the Youth Choir, the Church Orchestra, the Disciple Singers, and ran the Children's Choir Festival  for several years. As music director for Ner Tamid Synagogue in Rancho Bernardo, Ruth formed and directed the Ner Tamid Choir and the Klezmattack Ensemble. She organized and directed two JUMP festivals (Jews United in Music Performance) which aimed to unite the community in song, raise money to buy trees in Israel and sponsor cultural activities in San Diego.

Ruth is also Artistic Director for the Jean Will Presents concert series at the California Center for the Arts, Escondido, California.

As a classical pianist Ruth has performed internationally as well as in the U.S. She has worked with the Los Angeles Philharmonic Institute, Opera Aguascalientes, CSUN, The San Fernando Valley Men's Choir, and as a recording artist with the Marantz Pianocorder Division.

Discography

Awards and nominations

Education
Ruth Lopez-Yañez Weber received her Bachelor of Music degree from San Diego State University (SDSU), and her Master of Music degree from California State University, Northridge (CSUN).

References

External links
 Ruth Weber's website for further information

1959 births
21st-century American composers
21st-century American conductors (music)
21st-century American Jews
American film score composers
ASCAP composers and authors
California State University, Northridge alumni
Choral conductors
Jewish American film score composers
Jewish American songwriters
Light music composers
Living people
San Diego State University alumni
Women conductors (music)
Women film score composers